is a 1983 Japanese film starring Peter Fonda as a superhero called Gonzy Traumerai.  The film, written and directed by Ryu Murakami, based on his own novel, is a parody of such films as Superman, E.T. the Extra-Terrestrial, and Attack of the Killer Tomatoes.

External links
 

Films directed by Ryū Murakami
Japanese science fiction films
1980s science fiction films
Films shot in the Northern Mariana Islands
Films based on Japanese novels
1980s Japanese films